Vasileostrovkaya - is a station on the Nevsko–Vasileostrovskaya Line in St Petersburg.

It is named after Vasilyevsky Island where the station is located.

External links
 

Saint Petersburg Metro stations
Railway stations in Russia opened in 1967
Railway stations located underground in Russia